Lajos Jánossy  is a Hungarian name. (In original eastern name order: Jánossy Lajos) could refer to:

Lajos Jánossy (theologian) (1903-1976) and Lutheran pastor,
Lajos Jánossy  (1912-1978) physicist,  mathematician, and member of the Hungarian Academy of Sciences,
Lajos Jánossy (writer) (1967).